Ourapteryx is a genus of moths in the family Geometridae. The genus was erected by William Elford Leach in 1814.

Selected species

Ourapteryx caecata (Bastelberger, 1911)
Ourapteryx changi Inoue, 1985
Ourapteryx clara Matsumura, 1910
Ourapteryx claretta Holloway, 1982
Ourapteryx ebuleata  (Guenée, 1858) 
Ourapteryx excellens (Butler, 1889)
Ourapteryx falciformis Inoue, 1993
Ourapteryx flavovirens Inoue, 1985
Ourapteryx fulvinervis (Warren, 1894)
Ourapteryx incaudata Warren, 1897
Ourapteryx inspersa Wileman, 1912
Ourapteryx japonica Inoue, 1993
Ourapteryx maculicaudaria (Motschulsky, 1866)
Ourapteryx margaritata  (Moore, 1868)
Ourapteryx marginata (Hampson, 1895)
Ourapteryx monticola Inoue, 1985
Ourapteryx multistrigaria  Walker, 1866
Ourapteryx nigrociliaris Inoue, 1985
Ourapteryx obtusicauda (Warren, 1894)
Ourapteryx pallidula Inoue, 1985
Ourapteryx parallelaria (Leech, 1891)
Ourapteryx peermaadiata Thierry-Mieg, 1903
Ourapteryx persica (Ménétriés, 1832)
Ourapteryx picticaudata (Walker, 1860)
Ourapteryx pluristrigata Warren, 1888)
Ourapteryx podaliriata (Guenée, 1857)
Ourapteryx primularis (Butler, 1886)
Ourapteryx pura (Swinhoe, 1902)
Ourapteryx purissima Thierry-Meig, 1905
Ourapteryx ramosa (Wileman, 1910)
Ourapteryx sambucaria (Linnaeus, 1758)
Ourapteryx sciticaudaria (Walker, 1862)
Ourapteryx similaria (Matsumura, 1910)
Ourapteryx taiwana Wileman, 1910
Ourapteryx triangularia  Moore, 1867
Ourapteryx ussurica Inoue, 1993
Ourapteryx variolaria Inoue, 1985
Ourapteryx venusta Inoue, 1985
Ourapteryx yerburii Matsumura, 1910

References

Ourapterygini